Mark Rickland Johnson (born 28 October 1963) is a Jamaican born American former cricketer. A left-handed batsman and wicket-keeper, he played for the United States national cricket team between 2000 and 2005 and played two One Day Internationals (ODIs) in the 2004 ICC Champions Trophy.

Biography

Born in Jamaica in 1963, Mark Johnson first played for the US in 2000 when he played against a combined Minor Counties team on a tour of England. He made his List A debut later in the year against Jamaica and played four matches in total in that year's Red Stripe Bowl. The following year he played in the 2001 ICC Trophy in Ontario.

He next played for the US in 2004, when he played in the ICC 6 Nations Challenge in the United Arab Emirates. He also made his first-class debut in the same year, playing in the ICC Intercontinental Cup against Canada and Bermuda. In between the two Intercontinental Cup matches he played in the Americas Championship in Bermuda. Later in the year he played his only two ODIs, against New Zealand and Australia in the ICC Champions Trophy.

He last played for the US in the 2005 ICC Trophy in Ireland. After playing warm-up matches against the Northern Cricket Union President's XI and Namibia he played five matches in the tournament proper against the UAE, Denmark, Uganda, Bermuda and Papua New Guinea. Those five matches also represent the end of his List A career.

References

1963 births
Living people
United States One Day International cricketers
American cricketers
Jamaican emigrants to the United States
American sportspeople of Jamaican descent
Wicket-keepers